Iceland competed at the 1992 Winter Olympics in Albertville, France. Out of 5 participants, no medals were won.

Competitors
The following is the list of number of competitors in the Games.

Alpine skiing

Men

Women

Cross-country skiing

Men

1 Starting delay based on 10 km results. 
C = Classical style, F = Freestyle

References

Official Olympic Reports
 Olympic Winter Games 1992, full results by sports-reference.com

Nations at the 1992 Winter Olympics
1992
Winter Olympics